Kodie Bedford is an Aboriginal Australian screenwriter, filmmaker and playwright from Western Australia. She is known for her play Cursed!, and work on several television series, in particular the 2021 comedy series All My Friends are Racist.

Early life and education
Bedford was born in Western Australia of the Djaru and Gija people on her father's side and Irish and English on her mother's. She grew in Geraldton in the Pilbara region, and has strong family links in the East Kimberley region. An only child, she grew up with lots of cousins around her. She wanted to be a screenwriter from when she was a teenager, being a great fan of Buffy the Vampire Slayer, and credits storytelling with "saving her life". Her maternal grandmother, Valda Osborn, who loved Tolkien and Charles Dickens was also a great influence in her choice of writing as a career.

She earned a Bachelor of Communications at the University of Western Australia in 2007, taking courses in English, history, linguistics and communications. She moved to the East Kimberley afterwards to stay with her paternal grandmother there. It was a chance meeting with a video journalist from SBS at Halls Creek that led to her moving to Sydney to work in journalism.

She later (after 2013) gained a master's degree in creative writing from the University of Technology Sydney (UTS).

Career
Bedford lived in Redfern, Sydney, while working as a cadet journalist for SBS Television in 2008, which included working on Living Black. She then worked for ABC Television as a researcher for Message Stick, a documentary series focusing on Aboriginal issues. She spent some time shadowing Sally Riley, as head of Indigenous at the ABC, working on Redfern Now in 2012 to 2013, which led to her going to UTS to earn her Master's in Creative Writing.

Since leaving the ABC in 2015 she has worked as a freelance writer. She was given her "big break" in being invited to join the writing team for Bunya Productions' 2018 TV series Mystery Road as a note-taker, at the suggestion of Penny Smallacombe, head of Indigenous at Screen Australia. After one of the writers left, producer Greer Simpkin and head writer Michaeley O'Brien invited her to join the writing team. Bedford is inspired by Rachel Perkins, and wants to write stories about Western Australia.

Her debut film as a director was the short horror film "Scout", which was released in 2019 as part of the horror anthology Dark Place.

In 2019, Bedford won a Balnaves Fellowship to develop her own play with Belvoir Theatre, Cursed!, which was inspired by her family gathering in Geraldton when her grandmother (Valda Osborn) was dying. The black comedy was staged in the 2020 season, directed by Jason Klarwein. It was praised by critics and went on to win an AWGIE Award.

In 2021 she became the second writer on the ABC comedy series All My Friends Are Racist, created by Enoch Mailangi and directed by her partner Bjorn Stewart. She was also script producer and co-executive producer on the series. She said that it "was one of those rare experiences where the creative team, crew, producers and executives were all on the same page". The five-part series premiered on  ABC iview on 24 August 2021. It stars Davey Thompson, Tuuli Narkle, Leah Purcell, and Lisa Kay.

In 2022 she worked on Troppo.

Other roles
She is a co-founder of the Indigenous arts group, the Cope St Collective, and a founder member of the Australian Writers' Guild's Diversity and Inclusion Action Committee, along with Benjamin Law and others.

Selected productions

Television
Grace Beside Me (2018)
Mystery Road (2018– )
Squinters (2018–2019)
 Robbie Hood
All My Friends are Racist (2021)
Troppo (2022)

Film
"Scout", a short film in the horror anthology Dark Place (2019)

Play
Cursed! (2020)

Recognition and awards
 2019: Balnaves Fellowship
 2021: Winner, AWGIE Awards, major award and Best Stage Play for Cursed!
 2021: Nominee, Nick Enright Prize at the NSW Premier's Literary Awards, for Cursed!
 2021: Nominee, NSW Multicultural Award, for Cursed!
 2021: Winner, AACTA Award, Best Short Form Comedy, for All My Friends are Racist

Personal life
Her partner is Bjorn Stewart, a director and actor whom she met on the set of Redfern Now. She lives with him in the Blue Mountains, west of Sydney.

References

External links

Living people
Year of birth missing (living people)
Australian women film directors
Indigenous Australian filmmakers